"Break All Day!" is the eighteenth single by Japanese recording artist Alisa Mizuki. It was released on May 10, 2000 as the first single from Mizuki's fourth compilation album History: Alisa Mizuki Complete Single Collection.

The title track is a Japanese-language cover of "Viva la Fiesta" by S Club 7, from their debut studio album S Club. It was written by Cathy Dennis and Stargate members Hallgeir Rustan, Tor Erik hermansen and Mikkel Eriksen, while the Japanese lyrics were written by Kenzō Saeki. The cover was produced by Hideki Fujisawa, credited as Dance Man. The song served as theme song for the first half (episodes 1-14) of the third season of the Fuji TV drama Nurse no Oshigoto, which stars Mizuki in the lead role. The B-side, "Shake Love," was written by Kentarō Akutsu and composed and produced by Tourbillon keyboardist Hiroaki Hayama.

"Break All Day!" is Mizuki's first single to be released in maxi single (12 cm CD) format.

Chart performance 
"Break All Day!" debuted on the Oricon Weekly Singles chart at number 20 with 14,690 copies sold in its first week. The single charted for eight weeks and has sold a total of 46,150 copies.

Track listing

Charts and sales

References 

2000 singles
Alisa Mizuki songs
Japanese television drama theme songs
Song recordings produced by Stargate (record producers)
Songs written by Tor Erik Hermansen
Songs written by Mikkel Storleer Eriksen
Songs written by Hallgeir Rustan
2000 songs
Songs written by Cathy Dennis